Eric Pankey (born 1959 in Kansas City, Missouri) is an American poet and artist. He is married to the poet Jennifer Atkinson (born 1955).

Pankey's poetry has moved from the literal and narrative as in _Heartwood,_ towards the suggestiveness of Emerson, without the hopefulness implicit in Emerson's transcendentalism. In Pankey's poems, often written in free verse forms or in prose poetry, the hint of grand comprehensiveness is suggested, without the hope of absorption into a universalizing or redemptive whole. The result, as in his "Souvenir de Voyage" (2015 in Verse)—an implied answer to Baudelaire's "Invitation au Voyage," is a glimpse of redemption from which the speaker of the poems, and thus the reader, is blocked, a promise unfulfilled and perhaps unfulfillable. Behind this urge lies a religious impulse that may remind a reader of T. S. Eliot. Yet the persistence of the seeking separates Pankey from Samuel Beckett; he remains on the closer side of despair.

Life
He graduated with a BA from the University of Missouri in 1981 and in 1983, his MFA from Iowa University. In 1987, after teaching English at the high school level and writing poetry, he became the director of the Creative Writing Program at Washington University in St. Louis. He currently teaches at George Mason University. He lives with his wife and daughter in Fairfax, Virginia.

His work has appeared in Antioch Review, Antaeus, Denver Quarterly, Seneca Review, Quarry West, Superpresent, and AGNI. His papers are held at the Washington University library.

Awards
 1984 Walt Whitman Award* 1984 Younger Poets Award from Academy of American Poets selected by Mark Strand
 Ingram Merrill Foundation Award
 2000 Guggenheim Fellowship
 National Endowment for the Arts

Works

Poetry

Books
  chapbook

Anthologies

References

External links

official website
 "interview an interview with Eric Pankey", randomhouse
 "Eric Pankey", January 9, 2009, How a Poem Happens
 "32 Poems Interview with Eric Pankey", Serena M. Agusto-Cox, February 5, 2009, 32 Poems

1959 births
Living people
Writers from Kansas City, Missouri
American male poets
Washington University in St. Louis faculty
George Mason University faculty
University of Missouri alumni